Engelhardt may refer to:

Places
4217 Engelhardt, asteroid, named after geologist Wolf von Engelhardt
Engel'gardt, moon crater, named after astronomer Vasily Engelhardt
Engelhardt Ice Ridge, Antarctic feature, named after geophysicist Hermann Engelhardt

People
Notable people with the surname include:

Members of the noble Russian Engelhardt family, including:
Christoph von Engelhardt (1762-1831), Russian general
Alexander Bogdanovich Engelhardt (1795–1859), Russian general
Valerian Engelhardt (1798-1856), Russian general and public official
Nikolai Fedorovich Engelhardt (1799-1856), brother of Valerian Engelhardt and Lieutenant General
Vasily Engelhardt (1828-1915), Russian astronomer and public figure
Alexander Nikolayevich Engelhardt (1832-1893), Russian agricultural scientist
Aleksandra von Engelhardt (1754-1838), Russian noble and one of the "Potemkin nieces"
Varvara von Engelhardt (1752-1815), maiden name of Varvara Golitsyna, Russian noble and one of the "Potemkin nieces"
Yekaterina von Engelhardt (1761-1829), Russian noble and one of the "Potemkin nieces"
August Engelhardt (1875-1919), German author
Brett Engelhardt (born 1980), American ice hockey player
Bryan Engelhardt (born 1982), Dutch  baseball  player 
Christer Engelhardt (born 1969), Swedish politician
George Paul Engelhardt (1871–1942), American entomologist
Grigori Engelhardt (1759–1834), Russian general
Helen Engelhardt, American artist
Henry Engelhardt (born 1958), founder and chief executive of Admiral Group
H. Tristram Engelhardt Jr. (1941–2018), American philosopher and bioethicist
Johann Georg Veit Engelhardt (1791-1855), German theologian
Kurt D. Engelhardt (born 1960), United States federal judge
Marc Engelhardt, German bassoonist 
Marco Engelhardt (born 1980), German footballer
Netta Engelhardt, Israeli-American physicist
Nikolai Engelhardt (writer) (1867–1942)
Tom Engelhardt, American author, co-founder of American Empire Project, and creator of Tomdispatch.com 
Wolf von Engelhardt (1910–2008), German geologist
Zephyrin Engelhardt (1851-1934), German-born Roman Catholic priest
John Engelhardt (1963- ), Scientist who cloned the first ferret

Other uses
 Engelhardt collapsible lifeboats, lifeboats of the RMS Titanic included lifeboats A, B, C, and D

See also
Engelhard (disambiguation)
Engleheart
Englehart

German-language surnames
Natália Engelhardt